Alexander Lloyd (Alex) Nelson (born 21 March 1988, in Stoke-on-Trent) is a retired sprint athlete who represented Great Britain and Northern Ireland.

During the 2006 Beijing World Junior Championships he picked up two bronze medals, in 200 metres and 4 x 100 metre relay. He has a personal best of 6.78 in 60 metres, 10.31 in 100 metres and 20.49 in 200 metres. Also, in 2005 he came second in the 100 metres World Youth Championships in Athletics in a British one, two, behind Harry Aikines-Aryeetey and third at the European Junior Athletics Championships in Kaunas Lithuania. Two years later he returned to the same competition only this time staged in Hengelo, Holland and was victorious over the 200 m and placed 2nd in the 4x100 relay.

In July 2007 he came second behind Marlon Devonish in the men's 200 metres sprint at AAA British Athletics Championships.

His sister Ashleigh is also an international sprinter.

In 2008 Alex achieved the GB "A" Qualifying time for the Olympic Games and placed second at the AAA's Olympic Trials gaining him his first full senior international vest and first appearance at the Olympic Games. However at the 2008 Summer Olympics he did not start in his first round heat over 200 metres.

In 2011, Nelson announced his retirement from the sport.

Nelson is the cousin of both reality television contestant Wes Nelson and professional footballer Curtis Nelson.

References

External links

1988 births
Living people
Sportspeople from Stoke-on-Trent
British male sprinters
English male sprinters
Olympic athletes of Great Britain
Athletes (track and field) at the 2008 Summer Olympics
Black British sportsmen